Veritas School may refer to:

 Veritas School (Ridgeland, Mississippi)
 Veritas School (Newberg, Oregon)

See also
 Veritas Christian School (Lawrence, Kansas)